The 2008–09 Norwegian Futsal Premier League season (known as Telekiosken Futsal Liga for sponsorship reasons) is the first ever season for futsal in Norway. It began 29 November 2008 and ended 15 February 2009.

League table

Source: speaker.no
Rules for classification: 1st points; 2nd goal difference; 3rd goals scored.
P = Position; Pld = Matches played; W = Matches won; D = Matches drawn; L = Matches lost; GF = Goals for; GA = Goals against; GD = Goal difference; Pts = Points; (C) = Champion; (R) = Relegated.

See also
2008 in Norwegian football
2009 in Norwegian football
2008–09 Norwegian Futsal First Division

References

Norway
Futsal Premier League 2008-09
Futsal Premier League 2008-09
Futsal competitions in Norway